Splazsh is the second studio album by British electronic musician Actress. It was released on 8 June 2010 by Honest Jon's Records.

Critical reception

Accolades
Splazsh was ranked on numerous music critics' and publications' end-of-year albums lists, topping The Wire's "2010 Rewind", as well as being in the top five of Fact, Los Angeles Times critic Jeff Weiss and Resident Advisor. It was also put as an honorable mention on the lists of XLR8R and Pitchfork, which in 2014 listed the album number 91 on their "100 Best Albums of the Decade So Far".

Track listing

References 

2010 albums
Actress (musician) albums
Werk Discs albums